In geometry, the augmented tridiminished icosahedron is one of the
Johnson solids. It can be obtained by joining a tetrahedron to another Johnson solid, the tridiminished icosahedron.

External links
 

Johnson solids